The 1962 Coppa Italia Final was the final of the 1961–62 Coppa Italia. The match was played on 21 June 1962 between Napoli and SPAL. Napoli won 2–1; it was their first victory.

Match

References 
Coppa Italia 1961/62 statistics at rsssf.com
 https://www.calcio.com/calendario/ita-coppa-italia-1961-1962-finale/2/
 https://www.worldfootball.net/schedule/ita-coppa-italia-1961-1962-finale/2/

Coppa Italia Finals
Coppa Italia Final 1962
Coppa Italia Final 1962